Rancenay is a commune in the Doubs department in the Bourgogne-Franche-Comté region in eastern France.

Geography
The commune is bisected by the river Doubs.

Population

See also
 Communes of the Doubs department

References

External links

 Rancenay on the intercommunal Web site of the region 

Communes of Doubs